The Archaeological Museum of Ioannina is a museum located in Litharitsa Park in the centre of Ioannina, Greece.

The museum contains many artifacts unearthed in the surrounding area such as Palaeolithic tools, from Kokkinopilos, Asprochaliko and Kastritsa, the ruins of Dodoni and ancient cemeteries such as Vitsa and the Oracle of Acheron. The museum also has many inscriptions, headstones, and a collection of coins.

The building was designed by Greek architect Aris Konstantinidis (1913-1993).

External links
Official site (Greek only) / slideshow
Hellenic Ministry of Culture and Tourism / (in Greek)
University of Ioaninna
www.about-ioannina.gr *www.ioannina-portal.gr

Ioannina
Museums in Ioannina
1970 establishments in Greece
Museums established in 1970